Marion Community Unit School District 2 is a school district headquartered in Marion, Illinois. It serves sections of Williamson County and Johnson County. It serves thirteen townships, with all but one in Williamson County.

History
It was established in 1951 by a merger of about the entirety and/or portions of 45 existing school districts, including the Marion Township High School District.

In 2016 Marion CUSD had not yet received the requested federal and state funds for finishing the new high school's construction, so the school board was determining whether it should take out a credit line for up to $7.3 million for that purpose.

Schools
 Secondary schools
 Marion High School
 Marion Junior High School

 Elementary schools
 Adams School (Creal Springs Elementary School)
 Jefferson
 Lincoln
 Longfellow
 Washington

References

External links
 
School districts in Illinois
Marion, Illinois
Education in Williamson County, Illinois
Education in Johnson County, Illinois
1951 establishments in Illinois
School districts established in 1951